is a Buddhist temple in the town of Misasa, Tottori Prefecture, Japan. The  of Sanbutsu-ji, built in the Heian period is designated a National Treasure of Japan.

By tradition Sanbutsu-ji was founded by the Buddhist ascetic and mystic of the late Asuka period monk En no Gyōja (ca. 634–701). En no Gyōja is considered the founder of Shugendō, a syncretic religion which incorporated aspects Old Shinto, Japanese folk animism and shamanism, Taoism and esoteric Buddhism of the Shingon Mikkyō and the Tendai sects.

See also
 For an explanation of terms concerning Japanese Buddhism, Japanese Buddhist art, and Japanese Buddhist temple architecture, see the Glossary of Japanese Buddhism.

Related articles
 List of National Treasures of Japan--Shrines
 En no Gyōja
 Shugendō
 Mount Mitoku

References

External links
 三徳山三佛寺 (Home page) 
 三徳山を世界遺産 (Central Tottori General Office) 
 国指定文化財　(Japanese Agency for Cultural Affairs) 

Buddhist temples in Tottori Prefecture
9th-century establishments in Japan
Tendai temples
Religious buildings and structures completed in 849